Chanu IPS 2 is a 2019 Indian Meitei language film directed by Sanaton Nongthomba and produced by Linthoi Chanu, under the banner of Nongthombam Films. The film features Gokul Athokpam, Soma Laishram and Bala Hijam in the lead roles. The film was premiered at Manipur State Film Development Society (MSFDS), Palace Compound on 31 October 2019.

It is a sequel to the 2017 film Chanu IPS.

Cast 
 Gokul Athokpam as Khaba
 Soma Laishram as Laisna (Chanu IPS) 
 Bala Hijam as Laija
 Heisnam Geeta as Khaba's adopted mother
 Sagolsem Dhanamanjuri as Laija's mother
 Linthoi Chanu as Laisna's sister-in-law
 Tayenjam Mema
 Laimayum Gaitri
 Irom Shyamkishore
 Gunchenba Nongthombam
 Loya
 Khekman Ratan
 Ashok
 Jenny

Soundtrack
Vivek Ali Chongtham and Nanao Sagolmang composed the soundtrack for the film and Sanaton Nongthomba wrote the lyrics. The songs are titled Nakokta Napi Pakle and Mityengsina Uriba.

References 

2010s Meitei-language films
2019 films